"As One Door Closes" is an episode of the BBC sitcom, Only Fools and Horses. It was the final episode of series 4 and first broadcast on 4 April 1985. In the episode, Del and Rodney hunt for a rare butterfly.

Synopsis
Del Boy's latest get-rich-quick scheme involves super-sharp combs and louvre doors funded by Denzil's £2,000 redundancy money, which was manipulatively attained by Del. Brendan O'Shaughnessy and Teddy Cummings reject the louvre doors, which lands Del in trouble with Denzil, who is demanding his money back.

Rodney reads an article about a rare butterfly, and a butterfly collector's desire to catch it and pay a large sum of money to whoever brings it to him. Later, while hiding from Denzil's domineering brothers, they spot the butterfly in the local cemetery. After a lengthy chase, Rodney eventually captures it in the lake of the nearby park.

He hands it to Del, but Denzil, after hearing that Del has got him his money back, skates by and gives Del a high five, squashing the butterfly.

Episode cast

Production 
This episode contains a rare instance of the series using video rather than film for location scenes. This came about because the location sequences in some of the earlier episodes this series (including "Hole in One") had been filmed with Lennard Pearce prior to his death. When Buster Merryfield joined the series, the earlier episodes had to be refilmed, which left them with only enough money to film half of the location sequences in this episode. The BBC agreed to cover the budget shortfall, but on the condition that video be used instead of film, due to its lower cost.

Episode concept 
The idea for the script was based on a true story of a rare butterfly that John Sullivan had read about.

References

External links

Only Fools and Horses (series 4) episodes
1985 British television episodes